, son of regent Nijō Motonori, was a Japanese kugyō (court noble) of the Muromachi period (1336–1573). He held a regent position kampaku three times from 1453 to 1454, from 1455 to 1458 and from 1463 to 1467. He was the father of regent Nijō Masatsugu.

References
 

1416 births
1493 deaths
Fujiwara clan
Mochimichi